The 2023 Australian Open described in detail, in the form of day-by-day summaries.

All dates are AEDT (UTC+11)

Day 1 (16 January)
 Seeds out:
 Men's Singles:  Lorenzo Musetti [17],  Borna Ćorić [21]
 Women's singles:  Marie Bouzková [25],  Amanda Anisimova [28]
 Schedule of Play

Notes

Day 2 (17 January)
 Seeds out:
 Men's Singles:  Matteo Berrettini [13],  Miomir Kecmanović [26]
 Women's Singles:  Martina Trevisan [21],  Kaia Kanepi [31]
 Schedule of Play

Notes

Day 3 (18 January)
Rain disrupted play in all of the outdoor courts for over six hours at 17:30. Three of the five main courts (with retractable roofs) were actively open for the remainder of the session. The doubles matches were rescheduled to Day 4 in order to complete some 1st Round singles matches.
 Seeds out:
 Men's Singles:  Rafael Nadal [1],  Botic van de Zandschulp [32]
 Women's Singles:  Daria Kasatkina [8],  Beatriz Haddad Maia [14],  Petra Kvitová [15],  Zheng Qinwen [29],  Jil Teichmann [32]
 Schedule of Play

Day 4 (19 January)
The second round match between Andy Murray and Thanasi Kokkinakis lasted 5 hours and 45 minutes, with Murray won in fifth sets that it ended at 4:06 am AEDT, twenty-eight minutes shy of the latest night match finish since Lleyton Hewitt and Marcos Baghdatis in the 2008 Australian Open fifteen years exactly to this date. The match became the second longest match in the Australian Open history following the epic 2012 men's singles final.

 Seeds out:
 Men's Singles:  Casper Ruud [2],  Taylor Fritz [8],  Alexander Zverev [12],  Pablo Carreño Busta [14],  Diego Schwartzman [23],  Alejandro Davidovich Fokina [30]
 Women's Singles:  Ons Jabeur [2],  Veronika Kudermetova [9],  Anett Kontaveit [16],  Liudmila Samsonova [18],  Irina-Camelia Begu [27]
 Men's Doubles:  Rafael Matos /  David Vega Hernández [13]
 Women's Doubles:  Lyudmyla Kichenok /  Jeļena Ostapenko [5],  Alicja Rosolska /  Erin Routliffe [14]
 Schedule of Play

Day 5 (20 January)
 Seeds out:
 Men's Singles:  Daniil Medvedev [7],  Cameron Norrie [11],  Frances Tiafoe [16],  Denis Shapovalov [20],  Francisco Cerúndolo [28]
 Women's Singles:  Maria Sakkari [6],  Madison Keys [10],  Danielle Collins [13]
 Men's Doubles:  Simone Bolelli /  Fabio Fognini [9],   Rohan Bopanna /  Matthew Ebden [10],  Jamie Murray /  Michael Venus [11]
 Women's Doubles:  Kirsten Flipkens /  Laura Siegemund [13]
 Mixed Doubles:  Jessica Pegula /  Austin Krajicek [2],  Alicja Rosolska /  Jean-Julien Rojer [7]
 Schedule of Play

Day 6 (21 January)
 Seeds out:
 Men's Singles:  Dan Evans [25],  Grigor Dimitrov [27]
 Women's Singles:  Ekaterina Alexandrova [19],  Elise Mertens [26]
 Men's Doubles:  Nikola Mektić /  Mate Pavić [4],  Ivan Dodig /  Austin Krajicek [5],  Lloyd Glasspool /  Harri Heliövaara [6],  Santiago González /  Édouard Roger-Vasselin [15]
 Women's Doubles:  Nicole Melichar-Martinez /  Ellen Perez [9],  Asia Muhammad /  Taylor Townsend [12]
 Mixed Doubles:  Ena Shibahara /  Wesley Koolhof [4]
 Schedule of Play

Day 7 (22 January)
 Seeds out:
 Men's Singles:  Félix Auger-Aliassime [6],  Hubert Hurkacz [10],  Jannik Sinner [15],  Yoshihito Nishioka [31]
 Women's Singles:  Iga Świątek [1],  Coco Gauff [7],  Barbora Krejčíková [20]
 Women's Doubles:  Beatriz Haddad Maia /  Zhang Shuai [7],  Sania Mirza /  Anna Danilina [8]
 Mixed Doubles:  Nikola Mektić /  Demi Schuurs [5],  Gabriela Dabrowski /  Max Purcell [8]
 Schedule of Play

Day 8 (23 January)
 Seeds out:
 Men's Singles:  Holger Rune [9],  Alex de Minaur [22],  Roberto Bautista Agut [24]
 Women's Singles:  Caroline Garcia [4],  Belinda Bencic [12],  Zhang Shuai [23]
 Men's Doubles:  Rajeev Ram /   Joe Salisbury [2],   Juan Sebastian Cabal /  Robert Farah [12],  Matwe Middelkoop /  Robin Haase [16]
 Women's Doubles:  Miyu Kato /  Aldila Sutjiadi [16]
 Mixed Doubles:  Marcelo Arévalo /  Giuliana Olmos [1]
 Schedule of Play

Day 9 (24 January)
 Seeds out:
 Men's Singles:  Sebastian Korda [29]
 Women's Singles:  Jessica Pegula [3],  Jeļena Ostapenko [17]
 Men's Doubles:  Marcelo Arévalo /  Jean-Julien Rojer [3]
 Women's Doubles:  Gabriela Dabrowski /  Giuliana Olmos [3]
 Schedule of Play

Day 10 (25 January)
 Seeds out:
 Men's Singles:  Andrey Rublev [5]
 Women's Singles:  Karolína Plíšková [30]
 Men's Doubles:  Wesley Koolhof /  Neal Skupski [1],  Andreas Mies /  John Peers [14]
 Women's Doubles:  Storm Hunter /  Elise Mertens [4],  Desirae Krawczyk /  Demi Schuurs [6],  Chan Hao-ching /  Yang Zhaoxuan [11]
 Mixed Doubles:  Desirae Krawczyk /  Neal Skupski [3]
 Schedule of Play

Day 11 (26 January)
 Seeds out:
 Women's Singles:  Victoria Azarenka [24]
 Men's Doubles:  Marcel Granollers /  Horacio Zeballos [8]
 Schedule of Play

Day 12 (27 January)
 Seeds out:
 Men's Singles:  Karen Khachanov [18]
 Women's Doubles:  Coco Gauff /  Jessica Pegula [2]
 Schedule of Play

Day 13 (28 January)
 Seeds out:
 Women's Singles:  Elena Rybakina [22]
 Schedule of Play

Day 14 (29 January)
 Seeds out:
 Men's Singles:  Stefanos Tsitsipas [3]
 Women's Doubles:  Shuko Aoyama /  Ena Shibahara [10]
 Schedule of Play

References 

Day-by-day summaries
Australian Open (tennis) by year – Day-by-day summaries